The 1994 South African Open, also known as the Sun City Open, was a men's tennis tournament played on outdoor hard courts. It was the 89th edition of the South African Open and was part of the ATP World Series of the 1994 ATP Tour. It took place in Sun City, South Africa from 28 March through 3 April 1994. German Markus Zoecke won the singles final against compatriot Hendrik Dreekmann.

Finals

Singles
 Markus Zoecke defeated  Hendrik Dreekmann, 6–1, 6–4
 It was Zoecke's first and only singles ATP career title.

Doubles
 Marius Barnard /  Brent Haygarth defeated  Ellis Ferreira /  Grant Stafford, 6–3, 7–5

References

External links
 ITF tournament edition details

Moses Kotane Local Municipality
South African Open (tennis)
Sport in North West (South African province)
Tennis tournaments in South Africa
Open
1994 ATP Tour
March 1994 sports events in Africa
April 1994 sports events in Africa